Ban Noen may refer to:

Ban Noen, Bangkok, a road junction and neighbourhood in Bangkok Noi District, Bangkok
Ban Noen Subdistrict, a subdistrict (tambon) in Chian Yai District, Nakhon Si Thammarat
Ban Noen Subdistrict, a subdistrict (tambon) in Lom Kao District, Phetchabun